Arthur Black may refer to:

 Arthur Black (humorist) (1943—2018), Canadian writer and radio humorist
 Arthur Black (mathematician) (1851–1893), English mathematician
 Arthur Black (unionist politician) (1888–1968), Unionist politician and judge in Northern Ireland
 Arthur Black (Liberal politician) (1863–1947), Member of Parliament (MP) for Biggleswade, 1906–1918